K-1 World Grand Prix 2003 Final was a kickboxing event promoted by the K-1 organization. The event was held at the Tokyo Dome in Tokyo, Japan on Saturday, December 6, 2003 in front of 67,320 spectators. It was the eleventh K-1 World Grand Prix final involving ten of the world's best fighters (two being reservists).  The eight finalists had almost all qualified via preliminary events, while two additional fighters were invited as reserve fighters (for more detail on this see bulleted list below), with all bouts being fought under K-1 Rules (100 kg/156-220 lbs). As well as tournament bouts there was also an 'Opening Fight' between Yusuke Fujimoto and Matthias Riccio and a 'Super Fight' between Martin Holm and Jan Nortje, both fought under K-1 Rules.  In total there were fourteen fighters at the event, representing ten countries.

The considered favourite leading in was Stefan "Blitz" Leko, who was on a five-fight K-1 win streak throughout 2003, and had beaten Peter Aerts, Mike Bernardo and Francisco Filho leading up to the World Grand Prix. However, due to contractual disputes that arose prior to the tournament final, Leko was pulled out of the competition and replaced by former boxer Francois Botha. It would be a man who had previously lost to Leko that won the Grand Prix.

The tournament winner was Remy Bonjasky who defeated Musashi in the final by third round unanimous decision.  Both fighters would be making their first ever K-1 World Grand Prix final appearance, with Remy Bonjasky winning on his first visit to the finals.  

Qualifiers - Finalists
Cyril Abidi - Won fight at K-1 World Grand Prix 2003 Final Elimination
Peter Aerts- Won fight at K-1 World Grand Prix 2003 Final Elimination
Remy Bonjasky- Won fight at K-1 World Grand Prix 2003 Final Elimination
Francois Botha - Invitee, replaced Stefan Leko who had a contractual dispute
Peter Graham - Won fight at K-1 World Grand Prix 2003 Final Elimination
Alexey Ignashov - Won fight at K-1 World Grand Prix 2003 Final Elimination
Musashi - K-1 Survival 2003 Japan Grand Prix Final winner
Ray Sefo - Won fight at K-1 World Grand Prix 2003 Final Elimination

Qualifiers - Reservists
Bjorn Bregy - Invitee
Carter Williams - Invitee

K-1 World Grand Prix 2003 Final Tournament

* Francois Botha replaced Stefan Leko in the Quarter Finals due to contractual disputes and unconfirmed "injury"

Results

Trivia
This is the first of three K-1 World Grand Prix's won by Remy "the Flying Gentleman" Bonjasky.
This would start the beginning of a 7 fight win streak during the K-1 World Grand Prix by Bonjasky (which spans from the 2003 to 2005). As of 2006 only Ernesto Hoost has won that many fights in the K-1 World Grand Prix but Bonjasky's win streak started with his debut appearance in the K-1 World Grand Prix (2003) while Hoost's win streak occurred years after his K-1 World Grand Prix debut in 1993 (his streak was between 1999–2001).

See also
List of K-1 events
List of K-1 champions
List of male kickboxers

References

External links
K-1 Official Website
K-1sport.de - Your Source for Everything K-1

K-1 events
2003 in kickboxing
Kickboxing in Japan
Sports competitions in Tokyo